Claude Sydney William Denman (3 April 1896 – 27 May 1958) was an Australian rules footballer who played with St Kilda in the Victorian Football League (VFL).

Notes

External links 

1896 births
1958 deaths
Australian rules footballers from Victoria (Australia)
St Kilda Football Club players